Vettor Pisani was a screw corvette of the Italian  (Royal Navy) built in the late 1860s and early 1870s. The ship left Italy in 1882 for a three-year voyage round the world.

Design
The design for Vettor Pisani was prepared by the naval engineer Giuseppe Micheli. She displaced . She had a crew of 226.

Her propulsion system consisted of a single marine steam engine that drove a single screw propeller. Steam was supplied by a pair of coal-fired fire-tube boilers that were manufactured by the firm Guppy of Naples. To supplement the steam engines, she was fitted with a full ship rig.

The main battery for Vettor Pisani consisted of six  muzzle-loading guns, three guns per broadside. For close-range defense against torpedo boats, she initially carried a secondary battery of two  guns, two  guns, and two  guns. During a refit in 1879, she was rearmed with a main battery of ten 120 mm breech-loading guns. Four of these guns were removed in 1885.

Service history
The ship was laid down on 11 May 1867 in the Venice Naval Yard, under the name Briosa. While still under construction in 1868, she was renamed Vettor Pisani, and her completed hull was launched on 22 July 1869. Fitting out was completed by 10 April 1871. After entering service, Vettor Pisani was sent on a cruise abroad, and later in 1871, she had reached Japanese waters. She remained abroad the following year, and during the voyage she visited Australia and New Guinea. She was still in Australian waters in 1873. The ship was modernized in 1879.

Vettor Pisani embarked on a lengthy voyage overseas in the early 1880s with a variety of goals, including training the crew, showing the flag, and conducting extensive scientific experiments. These tests included hydrographic surveys, depth soundings, and collection of marine animals for later study. A temporary laboratory was set up in the gun battery deck. The ship's captain was Commander Giuseppe Palumbo for the duration of the voyage. Lieutenants Cesare Marcacci and Gaetano Chierchia were responsible for supervising most of the experiments, and Chierchia had been sent to study at the Zoological Station at Naples for three months before the trip. Anton Dohrn, the director of the facility, came aboard Vettor Pisani to discuss the expedition before the vessel sent sail, and he later welcomed the ship home. The ship departed from Naples on 20 April 1882.

Vettor Pisani conducted surveys off the coast of South America, including around the Chonos Archipelago between 23 November and 6 December 1882. Later, during an exploration of the Gulf of Corcovado, Vettor Pisani ran aground twice but her crew was able to free the vessel at high tide both times. While there, the captain named several islands that had previously not been named. In early 1883, Vettor Pisani visited Valparaiso, Chile; from there, she sailed to Coquimbo and then Caldera, where she conducted extensive surveys of the coast, which had been dangerous for merchant vessels due to insufficient charts. In March 1884, she arrived in the Galápagos Islands, where she conducted further tests. Vettor Pisani then crossed the Pacific, conducting additional surveys along the way, including near the Hawaiian Islands.

While still overseas later in 1884, Vettor Pisani was sent to East Asian waters to reinforce the Italian presence there, which at that time consisted of the screw corvette , during a period of tension that resulted in the Sino-French War. Vettor Pisani arrived back in Italy on 29 April 1885, having collected some 1,600 specimens over the course of the voyage. Later that year, she was reduced to a training ship for naval cadets at the Italian naval academy in Livorno. She served in this capacity until the early 1890s, and on 12 February 1893, the Italian navy discarded the ship. Her ultimate fate is unknown.

Notes

References

Further reading

Research vessels
1869 ships
Corvettes of the Regia Marina
Ships built by the Venetian Arsenal